Tredegar railway station was a station on the Sirhowy Railway. It served the town of Tredegar. The station was near the southern edge of Bedwellty Park.

History

The station was opened on 19 June 1865 by the Sirhowy Railway after the conversion of the Sirhowy Tramroad to a standard gauge railway.

The line south from Tredegar closed to goods traffic on 30 April 1969,

Accidents
On 17 December 1902 a fatal accident occurred when a train from Tredegar to Nantybwch with 9 loaded coal wagons and a brake van was stopped on the incline of 1 in 42 near Nantybwch. The driver uncoupled the engine for adjustments; on recoupling he backed the engine on to the wagons, setting them in motion back down the hill until they reached Tredegar, about 1½ miles distant, where a disastrous collision occurred.

Present day

The route has been reused by the modern A4048 road;

Notes

References

Route

Former London and North Western Railway stations
Railway stations in Great Britain opened in 1865
1865 establishments in Wales
Disused railway stations in Blaenau Gwent
Railway stations in Great Britain closed in 1960
1960 disestablishments in Wales